Navarre High School is one of six public high schools in the Santa Rosa County School District located in Navarre, Florida. It was established in 1996 and currently enrolls 2,309 students.

Campus
Navarre High School has a suburban-style campus.

Academics
Navarre High School offers just over one hundred courses: twenty-three fine art courses, seventeen math courses, seventeen science courses, thirteen social studies courses, thirteen business courses, twelve English courses, ten foreign language courses, six physical education courses, five general courses, NJROTC, and two DCT (Diversified Career Technology) courses. This includes thirty-four AP (Advanced Placement) courses.

Breakdown

Navarre High School's statistics:
 Male/Female - 51%/49%
 White: 81.4% - Black: 6.5% - Hispanic: 4.7% - Multiracial: 10.2% - Asian: 2.6% - Native American: 0.6%
 Graduation Rate: 91.3%
 FCAT passing scores: 94%

Athletics 
Navarre High School has a wide range of sports and athletic facilities, including 21 varsity sports, 12 junior varsity sports and more than 20 clubs and activity groups. The school mascot is 'The Raider'.

The football team has won six district championships and two regional championships .

Girls Weightlifting has won six state titles: 2009, 2013, 2015, 2016, 2017 and 2018.

NJROTC
Navarre High School provides the Navy Junior Reserved Officer Training Corps program, which is funded by the U.S. Navy. The curriculum is Naval Science I-IV. It is led by Senior Naval Science Instructor Captain Mike Fisher and Naval Science Instructor Gunnery Sergeant John Kapolczynski.

References

External links
 Navarre High School website
 Navarre Raider's Quarterback Club
 Santa Rosa School District website
 NHS Choral Department
 NHS alumni
 Navarre Press
 Navarre High School NJROTC

High schools in Santa Rosa County, Florida
Pensacola metropolitan area
Public high schools in Florida
Navarre, Florida